The Faculty of Law is one of the professional schools at the University of Otago. Otago is New Zealand's oldest law school, lectures in law having begun in 1873.  The Faculty of Law is currently located in the Richardson Building at Otago's main campus in the city of Dunedin.

The Faculty of Law awards the degrees of Bachelor of Laws (LL.B.), Master of Laws (LL.M.), and Doctor of Philosophy (Ph.D.). A Bachelor of Laws Honours program also exists and is reserved for approximately the top 10% of LL.B. students. In 2007, the Law Faculty had approximately 800 equivalent full-time students. Approximately 200 students are in each of second, third, and fourth-year law, and over 700 students are enrolled in the first-year LAWS 101 course, which is a prerequisite to being admitted into full-time legal studies as a second year law student. Approximately 60% of the law students are female.

The first law lecturer at Otago was Sir Robert Stout, who went on to serve as attorney-general, prime minister, and Chief Justice of New Zealand. Otago's law library is named the Robert Stout Law Library.

Jessica Palmer is the current dean of the Faculty of Law. The faculty is composed of 27 full-time academic staff members, with 10 full professors, 3 associate professors, 10 senior lecturers, and 4 lecturers.

The faculty leads the Human Genome Research Project, sponsored by the New Zealand Law Foundation, which considers issues in the regulation of human genome-based technologies in New Zealand, on a legal and ethical basis.

References 

University of Otago
Law schools in New Zealand
1873 establishments in New Zealand
Educational institutions established in 1873